"I Just Wanna Love U (Give It 2 Me)" is a song by American rapper Jay-Z, released as the first single from his 2000 album The Dynasty: Roc La Familia. It was produced by the Neptunes and features a chorus sung by Neptunes member Pharrell Williams, as well as Shay Haley and Omillio Sparks who all remain uncredited. The video for the song features cameos from rappers Lil' Kim,  Lil' Cease, Damon Dash, Beanie Sigel, Memphis Bleek, Jermaine Dupri and actor John Witherspoon. A music video directed by David Meyers was made for the song.

Janet Jackson included the song in a dance breakdown during "Nasty" on her All for You Tour. The song was also featured during Coldplay's Viva tour as pre-show music, a reference due to Jay-Z's feature on the track "Lost!". Beyoncé also included the song in the "Crazy in Love" breakdown on her I Am World Tour.

Jay-Z's first verse interpolates The Notorious B.I.G.'s song "The World Is Filled..." from the album Life After Death, as well as an interpolation from "I Wish" by Carl Thomas (the line "and I wish I never met her at all".) The chorus of the song is interpolated from "Give It to Me Baby" by Rick James.

Reception
During a spot on Bill Maher's talk show, Jay-Z revealed the song was based on a true story, about real life events that occurred during a Mary J. Blige afterparty. AllMusic's Steve Birchmeier considers "I Just Wanna Love U" to be "a fun, playful song miles away from the rugged Ruff Ryder beats Swizz Beatz had been offering Jay-Z a year earlier." In addition, Rob Marriott of Rolling Stone and Steve Juon of RapReviews.com describe it as a club-ready track that will get "whips hopping from coast to coast.". The single eventually became the first Jay-Z single to reach number one on the Hip-Hop/R&B chart. The song was voted number one by Complex for their Best Songs of the Decade list. The song peaked at number 11 on the Billboard Hot 100, number one on the Billboard Hot R&B/Hip-Hop Songs chart, number 3 on Billboard'''s Hot Rap Songs chart, and number 17 on the UK Singles Chart.

Britney Spears said she was inspired by Jay-Z and "I Just Wanna Love U (Give It 2 Me)" to work with the song's producers the Neptunes for her Britney'' album, saying "for this album I was really inspired by Jay-Z and the Neptunes, those were the two people I really listened to." Spears' single "I'm a Slave 4 U", released the following year, was produced by the Neptunes and became a defining hit in her career.

Formats and track listings

CD
 "I Just Wanna Love U (Radio Edit)" (3:50)
 "Parking Lot Pimpin" (4:15)
 "Hey Papi (Clean)" (4:27)
 "I Just Wanna Love U (Give It to Me) (Video)"

Vinyl

A-Side
 "I Just Wanna Love U (Give It 2 Me) (Radio Edit)"
 "I Just Wanna Love U (Give It 2 Me) (LP Version)"
 "I Just Wanna Love U (Give It 2 Me) (Instrumental)"

B-Side
 "Parking Lot Pimpin' (Radio Edit)"
 "Parking Lot Pimpin' (LP Version)"
 "Parking Lot Pimpin' (Instrumental)"

Charts

Weekly charts

Year-end charts

Certifications

See also
List of songs recorded by Jay-Z

References

2000 singles
2000 songs
Jay-Z songs
Pharrell Williams songs
Roc-A-Fella Records singles
Def Jam Recordings singles
Music videos directed by Dave Meyers (director)
Song recordings produced by the Neptunes
Songs written by Pharrell Williams
Songs written by Chad Hugo
Songs written by Jay-Z
Songs written by Mase
Songs written by the Notorious B.I.G.
Songs written by Rick James
Songs written by Sean Combs
Songs written by Too Short